"Appena prima di partire" is a pop song by Italian duo Zero Assoluto, released on February 27, 2007, from their self-titled second studio album, Appena prima di partire. The song was sung by the group at the Sanremo Music Festival 2007, reaching #9. During the Evening of Duets, the group sung the song with Nelly Furtado. The song was released on March 2, 2007, at the same time of the Festival.

The single was released only as a digital download, and it was not sold in Italian stores.

A new version was released in Germany on May 11, 2008, called "Win or Lose". Nelly Furtado joins them in the re-recording.

Music video
The "Appena prima di partire" music video was shot in Barcelona, and it was directed by Cosimo Alema. The video is a love story between an American boy and a Spanish girl.

There are three versions of the video. The first version features Zero Assoluto in the version without Nelly Furtado. In the second version Nelly Furtado's vocals are heard, but she does not appear. The third version is the video for the re-recorded version, "Win or Lose", and Nelly Furtado is in it.

2007 singles
2008 singles
Zero Assoluto songs
Nelly Furtado songs
Sanremo Music Festival songs
2007 songs
Song articles with missing songwriters